Joy to the World is the fifth studio album from the band Pink Martini. It was released on November 16, 2010 under the band's own label, Heinz Records. The album was recorded and mixed at Kung Fu Bakery in Portland, Oregon in May 2008 and from May–August 2010. Their rendition of "We Three Kings" was released as a Starbucks free download. In 2014 it was awarded a double silver certification from the Independent Music Companies Association, which indicated sales of at least 40,000 copies throughout Europe.

Track listing

Charts and certifications

Charts

Year-end charts

Certifications and sales

References

2010 albums
Pink Martini albums
Christmas albums by American artists
Heinz Records albums
Jazz Christmas albums
2010 Christmas albums